Wash or the Wash may refer to:

Industry and sanitation
 WASH or WaSH, "water, sanitation and hygiene", three related public health issues
 Wash (distilling), the liquid produced by the fermentation step in the production of distilled beverages
 Lime wash or whitewash, a low-cost industrial paint

Places
 The Wash, the square-mouthed estuary on the northwest margin of East Anglia in England
 Wash Creek, a stream in North Carolina
 Blanchard Park, Pomona College, California, commonly known as the Wash
 Clio, California, formerly known as Wash

People
 Wash (pharaoh), an ancient Egyptian predynastic ruler
 Wash (singer), an American singer
 Martha Wash (born 1953), American singer-songwriter and actress
 Todd Wash (born 1968), American football coach

Art, entertainment, and media
 WASH (FM), a radio station serving the Washington, D.C. area
 Wash (visual arts), a technique of applying a semi-transparent layer of color

Film and television
 The Wash (1988 film), film by Philip Kan Gotanda, based on his play The Wash (1985)
 The Wash (2001 film), a hip-hop styled film
 Wash (Firefly), a character on Firefly
 "Wash" (Prison Break episode), an episode of Prison Break

Music
 "Wash" (song), by Pearl Jam, 2003
 "The Wash" (song), by Dr. Dre and Snoop Dogg, 2002
 "Wash.", a song by Bon Iver from Bon Iver, 2011
 "Wash", a song by Lifehouse from Stanley Climbfall, 2002

Topography
 Wash, an area of washland intended to be flooded when river levels are high
 Arroyo (creek) or wash, a dry creek bed or gulch that temporarily fills with water after a heavy rain

See also
 Car wash (disambiguation)
 
 Washer (disambiguation)
 Washing
 Washington (disambiguation), various uses commonly abbreviated as "Wash."